Mga Awiting Pilipino is the second studio album in the Filipino language by Filipino singer-actress Nora Aunor. The album was released in 1972 by Alpha Records Corporation in the Philippines in LP format  The album also contains some original Filipino compositions by Levi Celerio, a National Artist for Music.

Background
The album also contains 12 Filipino Folk songs. Most of them are regional folk songs sung in the local dialect like "Dandansoy" and "Walay Angay" in Hiligaynon, "Ay Kalisud" in Cebuano, "Sarung Banggi" in Bikol among others.

Track listing

Side One

Side Two

See also
Nora Aunor discography

References 

Nora Aunor albums
1972 albums